Baali Umar Ko Salaam is a 1994 Hindi film starring Kamal Sadanah and Tisca Chopra.

Plot
Rahul (Kamal Sadanah), the only son of Seth Banwarilal (Anupam Kher), does not think twice before spending money, and is also very arrogant and shrude. Seth Banwarilal is always tensed about Rahul and decides to get him married in order to get him on the right track. Rahul, not wanting to marry, runs away from his house along with Peter (Ali Asgar), to Chamba. Here, he comes in contact with Nikky (Tisca Chopra), who is the daughter of the industrialist Mr. Jalan (Saeed Jaffrey). After many conflicts, fights and misunderstandings, the two fall in love. Rahul wants to marry Nikky, but, Banwarilal does not want Rahul to marry a girl of his choice. On the other hand, Jalan also disapproves Rahul. Will the two be able to marry each other and live the life of their dreams? Will Banwarilal and Jalan accept the couple?

Cast
Kamal Sadanah as Rahul
Tisca Chopra as Nikky
Anupam Kher as Seth Banwarilal
Saeed Jaffrey as Mr. Jalan
Ali Asgar as Peter
Beena Banerjee as Mrs. Ansimal

Music
The songs were penned by Nawab Arzoo.

"Meri Zindagi Teri Chahat Ke Naam, Baali Umar Ko Salam" - Kumar Sanu
"Meri Zindagi Teri Chahat Ke Naam, Bali Umar Ko Salam" (Female) - Alka Yagnik
"Darte Darte Tum Kaho Kuch Darte Darte Hum Kahe" - Asha Bhosle, Kumar Sanu
"Aakho Se Aakhe Milau To Ho Jaayga Deewana" - Kumar Sanu, Rajshree Biswas
"Tune Tune Mera Dil Le Liya, Maine Maine Pyar Kiya" - Mohammed Aziz
"Chupke Teri Aankho Me Sari Duniya Se Hum Chhup Jaaynge" - Asha Bhosle, Udit Narayan
"Ding Dong Ding Dong, Pehli Najar Me Dekha Tujhe" - Kumar Sanu, Alka Yagnik

References

External links
 

1994 films
Films scored by Bappi Lahiri
1990s Hindi-language films